The 18th South American Youth Championships in Athletics were held
in Caracas, Venezuela from October 14–15, 2006.  The event was
relocated from the Estadio Pueblo Nuevo in San Cristóbal, Táchira,
Venezuela, because the renovation of the stadium for the Copa América de Fútbol 2007 was not yet completed.  A detailed report on the results was given.

Medal summary
Medal winners are published.
Complete results can be found on the Fecodatle, and on the "World Junior Athletics History"
website.

Men

Women

Medal table (unofficial)

Team trophies
The placing tables for team trophy (overall team, men and women categories) were published.

Total

Male

Female

Participation (unofficial)
Detailed result lists can be found  on the Fecodatle, and on the "World Junior Athletics History"
website. An unofficial count yields the number of about 281
athletes from about 13 countries: 

 (16)
 (5)
 (67)
 (42)
 (36)
 (26)
 (2)
 Panamá (6)
 (4)
 Perú (17)
 (2)
 (5)
 (53)

References

External links
World Junior Athletics History

South American U18 Championships in Athletics
2006 in Venezuelan sport
South American U18 Championships
International athletics competitions hosted by Venezuela
Ath
2006 in youth sport